Old Czech Legends is a 1953 Czechoslovak stop motion puppet animation film directed by Jiří Trnka. It is based on the 1894 book Ancient Bohemian Legends by Alois Jirásek.

Production
After the completion of Prince Bayaya in 1950, Trnka was praised by the communist regime of Czechoslovakia, and asked to make more films. He planned to make an adaptation of Don Quixote, but was rejected for the theme being too cosmopolitan.
He was pressed to make an adaptation of Jirásek's Ancient Bohemian Legends. Trnka initially didn't want to work on the project.

The film has a complex story with many characters and features complicated scenes both to stage and animate. Trnka's use of camera movements, lighting, set design, character design and animation and general storytelling made this an influential film in the history of animation.

Voice cast
 Růžena Nasková
 Zdeněk Štěpánek
 Eduard Kohout
 Václav Vydra
 Karel Höger

References

External links
 
Jiří Trnka: an artist who turned puppets into film stars

1952 animated films
1952 films
Czech mythology
Czechoslovak animated films
1950s Czech-language films
Films directed by Jiří Trnka
1950s stop-motion animated films
Animated films based on Slavic mythology
Films based on works by Alois Jirásek
Czech animated films
Czech fantasy films
Czech historical films
Films with screenplays by Jiří Brdečka
1950s Czech films
Czech animated fantasy films